The Hollywood Critics Association (HCA) is a film critic organization in Los Angeles, California. It was founded in 2016 as the Los Angeles Online Film Critics Society and renamed in 2019.

History
In 2016, Scott Menzel, Scott Mantz, and Ashley Menzel noted that Los Angeles only had one film critic organization. They founded the Los Angeles Online Film Critics Society to be a critics group that is diverse and supports underrepresented voices.

The group originally separated directing honors by gender. "There has been so much conversation about the power of female filmmakers and we wanted to embrace it," said Scott Mantz.

On January 10, 2018, the group held its first annual Film Awards at the Taglyan Complex in Los Angeles.

In early 2019, the HCA had a film discussion podcast called "Film Critics Weekly" on the defunct online broadcasting network "Popcorn Talk".

On August 29, 2021, the HCA held its inaugural Hollywood Critics Association TV Awards. The event was originally to take place in-person but was shifted to virtual due to the COVID-19 pandemic. Ashley Menzel said, “Over these past 14 months, many of us have been watching more television than ever before. This is why we are absolutely delighted that our first in-person event for 2021 will begin with a brand-new event paying tribute to the best of television”.

On February 28, 2022, the HCA held its 5th Annual Film Awards at the Avalon Hollywood. Apple TV+'s CODA took home Best Picture, Best Adapted Screenplay, and Best Supporting Actor for Troy Kotsur. Kristen Stewart won Best Actress for her role in Spencer and Andrew Garfield won Best Actor for his performance in Tick, Tick... BOOM!

On August 13 and 14, 2022, the HCA hosted their 2nd Annual HCA TV Awards at the Beverly Hilton. The two-night event dedicated one night to broadcast and cable networks and the other to streaming platforms. Dulcé Sloan hosted night one while Cameron Esposito hosted night two.

On August 30, 2022, The Hollywood Reporter reported that nine of the group's members had recently resigned, "roughly 7 percent of its membership tally just two weeks ago" as a result of one member's actions and ultimate removal "for violating numerous HCA bylaws, including harassment, bullying, slander, sharing member-only information with non-members and breaking the code of conduct."

On October 13, 2022, HCA President Nikki Fowler announced the Inaugural Creative Arts Awards, "dedicated to celebrating those behind the scenes who don’t often get the level of recognition they deserve."

On December 15, 2022, Variety shared the list of nominations for the 6th Annual HCA Film Awards and the Inaugural HCA Creative Arts Awards noting that A24’s ‘Everything Everywhere All at Once’ Leads HCA Film Awards Total Nominations With 16.  On February 16, 2023, The Hollywood Critics Association announced a new partnership with KNEKT Television Network where the Film Awards would be live-streamed on their network in addition to the official HCA App and YouTube channel.  

On February 24, 2023, The 6th Annual HCA Film Awards took place at the Beverly Wilshire, a Four Seasons Hotel. A24's Everything Everywhere All At Once took home a total of six awards. 

On March 3, 2023, The Hollywood Critics Association reported that their 2023 HCA Film Awards saw its highest viewership to date, quadrupling the view count of last year’s HCA TV Awards by 80%. The 2023 HCA Film Awards ceremony, which was simulcast live on the official HCA YouTube Channel, HCA App, and KNEKT Television Network, has been viewed by over 1 million people globally.

Board of Directors

The board of directors and officers of the organization, as of 2022, are:
 Scott Menzel, Chairman
 Nikki Fowler, President 
 Nestor Bentancor, Vice President
 Morgan Rojas, Secretary
 Dan Murrell, Public Information Officer

Fund-raising 
In 2020, the Hollywood Critics Association organized a Film & Television Triviathon to collect funds for Covid-19 recovery.

Film Award categories 
Each December, the association releases the nominations for the HCA Film Awards, which are held in January of the following year.

Current Categories 
Best Picture (since 2017)
Best Actor (since 2017)
Best Actress (since 2017)
Best Supporting Actor (since 2017)
Best Supporting Actress (since 2017)
Best Animated or VFX Performance (since 2017)
Best Original Screenplay (since 2017)
Best Adapted Screenplay (since 2017)
Best Action Film (since 2017)
Best Animated Film (since 2017)
Best Documentary (since 2017)
Best Indie Film (since 2017)
Best Foreign Film (since 2017)
Best First Feature (since 2017)
Best Stunts (since 2017)
Best Ensemble Cast (since 2018)
Best Original Song (since 2018)
Best Horror (since 2019)
Best Short Film (since 2020)
Best Director (since 2021)
Best Comedy (since 2022)

Discontinued Categories 
Best Blockbuster (2017 to 2019)
Best Cinematography (2017 to 2021)
Best Comedy or Musical (2017 to 2021)
Best Editing (2017 to 2021)
Best Female Director (2017 to 2020)
Best Male Director (2017 to 2020)
Best Sci-Fi/Horror (2017 to 2018)
Best Score (2017 to 2021)
Best Visual Effects (2017 to 2021)
Best Costume Design (2019 to 2021)
Best Hair & Makeup (2019 to 2021)
Best Production Design (2020 to 2021)

Honorary Awards 

Trailblazer Award (since 2017)
Newcomer Award (since 2018)
Acting Achievement Award (since 2018)
Filmmaking Achievement Award (since 2019)
Artisans Achievement Award (since 2019)
Game Changer Award (since 2019)
Star on the Rise (since 2019)
Filmmaker on the Rise (since 2019)
Inspire Award (since 2019)
Spotlight Award (since 2019)
Timeless Award (since 2020)

End of a Decade Awards 

Filmmaker of the Decade Award (2019 only)
Actress of the Decade Award (2019 only)
Actor of the Decade Award (2019 only)
Producer of the Decade Award (2019 only)
Next Generation Award (2019 only)

Midseason Award categories 
Halfway through the year, the association releases the nominations for the HCA Midseason Film Awards, which honor films that come out in the first half of the respected year. The nominations are announced the last week of June, and winners are announced the first week of July.

Current Categories 
Best Picture (since 2018)
Best Actor (since 2018)
Best Actress (since 2018)
Best Supporting Actor (since 2018)
Best Supporting Actress (since 2018)
Best Screenplay (since 2018)
Best Indie Film (since 2019)
Most Anticipated Film (since 2021)
Best Director (since 2022)
Best Horror (since 2022)

Discontinued Categories 
Best Female Director (2018 to 2020)
Best Male Director (2018 to 2020)
Best Filmmaker (2021 only)

TV Award categories 
The Hollywood Critics Association announced that they were launching the HCA TV Awards on March 24, 2021. The inaugural TV awards ceremony took place on August 22, 2021. The following is a list of the current and discontinued categories of the television awards as of 2022.

Current Categories
Best Actor in a Broadcast Network or Cable Series, Comedy (since 2021)
Best Actor in a Broadcast Network or Cable Series, Drama (since 2021)
Best Actor in a Streaming Series, Comedy (since 2021)
Best Actor in a Streaming Series, Drama (since 2021)
Best Actress in a Broadcast Network or Cable Series, Comedy (since 2021)
Best Actress in a Broadcast Network or Cable Series, Drama (since 2021)
Best Actress in a Streaming Series, Comedy (since 2021)
Best Actress in a Streaming Series, Drama (since 2021)
Best Broadcast Network Series, Comedy (since 2021)
Best Broadcast Network Series, Drama (since 2021)
Best Broadcast Network or Cable Docuseries, Documentary Television Movie, or Non-Fiction Series (since 2021)
Best Broadcast Network or Cable Sketch Series, Variety Series, Talk Show or Comedy/Variety Special (since 2021)
Best Cable Series, Comedy (since 2021)
Best Cable Series, Drama (since 2021)
Best Streaming Docuseries, Documentary Television Movie, or Non-Fiction Series (since 2021)
Best Streaming Series, Comedy (since 2021)
Best Streaming Series, Drama (since 2021)
Best Supporting Actor in a Broadcast Network or Cable Series, Comedy (since 2021)
Best Supporting Actor in a Broadcast Network or Cable Series, Drama (since 2021)
Best Supporting Actor in a Streaming Series, Comedy (since 2021)
Best Supporting Actor in a Streaming Series, Drama (since 2021)
Best Supporting Actress in a Broadcast Network or Cable Series, Comedy (since 2021)
Best Supporting Actress in a Broadcast Network or Cable Series, Drama (since 2021)
Best Supporting Actress in a Streaming Series, Comedy (since 2021)
Best Supporting Actress in a Streaming Series, Drama (since 2021)
Best Actor in a Broadcast Network or Cable Limited or Anthology Series (since 2022)
Best Actress in a Broadcast Network or Cable Limited or Anthology Series (since 2022)
Best Actor in a Streaming Limited or Anthology Series (since 2022)
Best Actress in a Streaming Limited or Anthology Series (since 2022)
Best Broadcast Network or Cable Animated Series or Television Movie (since 2022)
Best Broadcast Network or Cable Limited or Anthology Series (since 2022)
Best Broadcast Network or Cable Live-Action Television Movie (since 2022)
Best Broadcast Network or Cable Reality Show or Competition Series (since 2022)
Best Comedy or Standup Special (since 2022)
Best Directing in a Broadcast Network or Cable Series, Comedy (since 2022)
Best Directing in a Broadcast Network or Cable Series, Drama (since 2022)
Best Directing in a Broadcast Network or Cable Limited or Anthology Series (since 2022)
Best Directing in a Streaming Series, Comedy (since 2022)
Best Directing in a Streaming Series, Drama (since 2022)
Best Directing in a Streaming Limited or Anthology Series (since 2022)
Best Game Show (since 2022)
Best International Series (since 2022)
Best Short Form Animation Series (since 2022)
Best Short Form Comedy or Drama Series (since 2022)
Best Short Form Documentary or Non-Fiction Series (since 2022)
Best Streaming Animated Series or Television Movie (since 2022)
Best Streaming Limited or Anthology Series (since 2022)
Best Streaming Movie (since 2022)
Best Streaming Reality Show or Competition Series (since 2022)
Best Streaming Variety Sketch Series, Talk Series, or Special (since 2022)
Best Supporting Actor in a Broadcast Network or Cable Limited or Anthology Series (since 2022)
Best Supporting Actress in a Broadcast Network or Cable Limited or Anthology Series (since 2022)
Best Supporting Actor in a Streaming Limited or Anthology Series (since 2022)
Best Supporting Actress in a Streaming Limited or Anthology Series (since 2022)
Best Writing in a Broadcast Network or Cables Series, Comedy (since 2022)
Best Writing in a Broadcast Network or Cable Series, Drama (since 2022)
Best Writing in a Broadcast Network or Cable Limited or Anthology Series (since 2022)
Best Writing in a Streaming Series, Comedy (since 2022)
Best Writing in a Streaming Series, Drama (since 2022)
Best Writing in a Streaming Limited or Anthology Series (since 2022)

Discontinued Categories
Best Actor in a Limited Series, Anthology Series, or Television Movie (2021 only)
Best Actress in a Limited Series, Anthology Series or Television Movie (2021 only)
Best Animated Series or Animated Television Movie (2021 only)
Best Broadcast Network or Cable Limited Series, Anthology Series or Live-Action Television Movie (2021 only)
Best Broadcast Network Reality Series, Competition Series, or Game Show (2021 only)
Best Cable or Streaming Reality Series, Competition Series, or Game Show (2021 only)
Best Streaming Limited Series, Anthology Series, or Live-Action Television Movie (2021 only)
Best Streaming Sketch Series, Variety Series, Talk Show, or Comedy/Variety Special (2021 only)
Best Supporting Actor in a Limited Series, Anthology Series, or Television Movie (2021 only)
Best Supporting Actress in a Limited Series, Anthology Series, or Television Movie (2021 only)

Honorary Awards
Legacy Award (since 2021)
Virtuoso Award (since 2021)
Impact Award (since 2021)
TV Icon Award (since 2021)
Pop Culture Icon Award (since 2021)
TV Breakout Star Award (since 2021)
Spotlight Award (since 2021)

Creative Arts categories 
The Hollywood Critics Association announced the launch of the HCA Creative Arts Awards on October 13, 2022. The inaugural Creative Awards Awards ceremony will take place on February 24, 2023. The following is a list of the current categories of the Creative Arts awards as of 2022.

Current Categories
 Best Casting Director (since 2022)
 Best Cinematography (since 2022)
 Best Costume Design (since 2022)
 Best Editing (since 2022)
 Best Hair & Make-Up (since 2022)
 Best Marketing Campaign (since 2022)
 Best Production Design (since 2022)
 Best Score (since 2022)
 Best Sound (since 2022)
 Best Visual Effects (since 2022)

Award ceremonies

Film
 2017
 2018
 2019
 2020
 2021
 2022

Midseason
 2018
 2019
 2020
 2021
 2022

TV
 2021
 2022

Creative Arts
 2022

References

External links

 
2016 establishments in California
American film critics associations
Cinema of Southern California
Arts organizations based in California
Culture of Los Angeles
Mass media in Los Angeles
Organizations based in Los Angeles